Bauer Media Audio UK is a UK-based radio division of the Bauer Media Group owning, among other brands, Absolute Radio, Greatest Hits Radio, Jazz FM, and Magic.

History

In early 2008, German magazine publisher Bauer bought the radio division of British company Emap, which had been established as East Midland Allied Press in 1947. Consequently, Emap Radio Limited was renamed to Bauer Radio Limited.

Emap's assets included national stations Kiss, Kerrang! and Magic, and local stations under the Big City Network brand in England, Scotland and Northern Ireland. These included 22 local FM stations in Scotland which Emap had bought from Scottish Radio Holdings in 2005.

In April 2011, Bauer Radio announced it would be restructuring its radio portfolio into two divisions: locally focused and heritage stations – including many of the Big City stations, South Coast station Wave 105 and London station Magic 105.4 FM – would become part of the "Bauer Place" division, with branded music-category stations such as Kiss and Kerrang forming a second sub-brand, "Bauer Passion". The Big City Network identity was dropped as part of the restructuring.

In April 2013, Bauer announced it would merge its two North East England stations, Metro Radio and TFM. Both stations broadcast shared programming from Newcastle and Manchester while carrying separate branding, news bulletins and advertising.

In September 2014, Bauer announced it would be restructuring its radio portfolio as from January 2015. Magic AM in England was dropped in favour of the stations reverting to their heritage station names. The stations now form part of the new 'City 2' network serving both Scotland and Northern England. A 'City 3' network on DAB replacing The Hits Radio (in most areas) launched on Monday 19 January 2015. As part of this restructuring, the Place and Passion network banners introduced in 2011 were replaced by the current Bauer City and Bauer National divisions. (The 'City 3' network was withdrawn in favour of reverting to the networked The Hits service from September 2017.)

At the beginning of March 2016, Bauer moved two of its stations, Planet Rock and Absolute 80s, from Digital One onto the Sound Digital multiplex, reducing the availability of these stations (areas including East Anglia, the South West, parts of Kent, Cumbria, and large areas of Wales and Scotland had no Sound Digital network transmitters at all). The issue was reported in local media in some areas. Planet Rock and Absolute 80s on D1 began broadcasting just a retune message loop from 18 April and the switch-off occurred on 30 April.

On 6 May 2016, Bauer announced it had bought Midlands radio group Orion Media for an undisclosed fee, reportedly between £40 and £50 million. It was subsequently confirmed that Orion's stations Free Radio (West Midlands) and Gem (East Midlands) would become part of the Bauer City portfolio, with Gem introducing a version of the City sonic logo device to its presentation from August 2016.

On 16 August 2018, Bauer announced that it had bought Jazz FM for an undisclosed sum.

In February 2019, Bauer purchased Lincs FM Group, Celador and the local stations owned by Wireless Group and the following month Bauer purchased the ten FM stations owned by UKRD.

On 14 April 2020 the Competition and Markets Authority revoked the Initial Enforcement Orders in relation to the acquisition by Bauer Radio Group Limited of certain assets of the Celador Entertainment Limited business on 1 March, certain assets of the Lincs FM Group Limited business on 1 March 2019, and of UKRD Group Limited on 12 March 2019 and Scala Radio LP of certain assets of Wireless Group Limited business on 1 March 2019.

Radio brands

Networks

Absolute

This comprises seven decade-themed services and a dedicated classic-rock station. The network is aimed at 35 to 54 year olds.
 Absolute Radio
 Absolute Radio 60s
 Absolute Radio 70s
 Absolute Radio 80s
 Absolute Radio 90s
 Absolute Radio 00s
 Absolute Radio 10s
 Absolute Radio 20s
 Absolute Radio Classic Rock
 Absolute Radio Country

Hits Radio Brand
Greatest Hits Radio, Classic hits radio network of 44 radio stations, available on local AM, FM and DAB, with a national DAB station.
Hits Radio, a Contemporary hit radio network of 25 radio stations, available on local FM and DAB, with a national DAB station. 
 Hits Radio Pride, launched in 2020.

Jazz FM
Jazz FM, DAB service available nationally playing jazz, blues and soul, based from London, acquired by Bauer in 2018.

From 7 May 2021, the station has 20 additional stations available online with a premium subscription.
After Hours
Avant Garde
Best Live Jazz Performances
Big Band and Swing
Big Easy
Carnival
Crossroads
Dinner Jazz
Headliners
Jazz DNA
Jazz Funk Party
Move On Up - Funk and Soul
New Heat
Piano Jazz
Players Lounge
Relax with Jazz
Robbie Vincent's Music Garden Party (originally called Rhythm - The Beat Goes On)
Smooth and Soulful Jazz
Summertime
Vocal Expression

Kerrang!

A network similar to Absolute, dedicated to rock music.

From 7 May 2021, the station has had 20 additional stations available online with a premium subscription.
Alt Rock 80s
Alt Rock 90s
Alt Rock 00s
Alt Rock 10s
Alt New Rock
Alt Rock Anthems
Alt Rock Party
Alt Rock Workday
Alt Rock Workout
Everything Emo
Fresh Blood
Full Metal Racket
Goth Rock Party
Grunge Garden
Kerrang! Radio Unleashed
Klassic Kerrang! Radio
Non Stop Headliners
Pop Punk Ruuules!
PWR Up Live
Rebel Rebel
The Moshpit
US Rocks

KISS

The KISS network is aimed at a young 15-34 audience and plays predominantly rhythmic (dance/urban) music.
 KISS, Available on Digital One national DAB and on Sky and Freeview across the UK. 
 DAB stations:
 Kisstory, DAB station, dedicated to old skool and anthems.
 Kiss Fresh, DAB station, playing non-stop new beats.
 Online only stations:
 Kiss Bliss, station playing slow paced and acoustic music relating to the Kiss brand.
 Kiss Dance, playing the latest dance music.
 Kiss Garage, dedicated to the UK garage scene.
 Kiss Ibiza, station playing the biggest mixes from electronic dance music.

Magic

 Magic, Melodic adult-contemporary music service aimed at 25 to 54 year olds, available on DAB nationally and on FM in London.
 Magic Chilled, Laid-back modern hits (principally mellow chart pop of the 1990s and 2000s).
 Magic Mellow (also known as Mellow Magic), Melodic classic hits and love songs.
 Magic Soul, A mix of soul, funk, Motown and R&B music.
 Magic Workout, Online only station playing the classic dance tracks.
 Magic at the Musicals, DAB+ station playing show tunes.
 Magic 100% Christmas, Online only station playing Christmas music.

Planet Rock
Planet Rock, DAB radio station, which plays primarily classic rock music.

From 7 May 2021, the station, along with has had 20 additional stations available online with a premium subscription.
Acoustic Amps Off
Americana
Chilled Rock
Classic 70s Rock
Classic 80s Rock
Classic 90s Rock
Classic 00s Rock
Classic 10s Rock
Driving Songs
Hair Metal Heroes
Main Stage Live
New Rock
Party Rock
Power Anthems
Rock Ballads
Rock Your Workout (temporarily renamed Bloodstock Radio during the 2021 Bloodstock Open Air)
The Blues Bar
The Prog Lab
UK Rocks
Workday Rocks

Scala Radio
Scala Radio, Classical music national station broadcast digitally (Sound Digital and online) from 4 March 2019.

From 7 May 2021, the station has 20 additional stations available online with a premium subscription.
100% Baroque
100% Mozart
20th Century Classics
Car Journey Classical
Classical Bangers
Contemporary Classical
Dinner Party
Hit the Dancefloor
In the Park
Mindfulness Music
Movie Blockbusters
Piano Playlist
Screen Time
The Big Composers
The Classical Era
The Console
The Jukebox
The Romantics
The Study Space
Time to Sing!

Stand alone

National/ part-national
 Heat Radio, contemporary pop, cobranded with Bauer's Heat magazine. Online; Local DAB and Freeview.

Local 

Cool FM, CHR station on FM in Belfast and DAB across Northern Ireland, part of Hits Radio for advertising purposes.
Downtown Radio, Hot AC station on AM/DAB in Belfast and FM/DAB in the rest of Northern Ireland, part of Hits Radio for advertising purposes.
Downtown Country, Dedicated digital country music station on DAB in Northern Ireland.
Lincs FM, Hot AC station in Lincolnshire & Newark. All programming is locally produced.
Metro Radio, Newcastle upon Tyne and North East based station with some locally produced shows. Most notable for formerly hosting Alan Robson's Night Owls, the UK's longest running phone in show.
Pirate FM, Hot AC station based in the Carn Brea area of Redruth, Cornwall.  All programming is locally produced.
Wave 105, Hot AC station in Solent. All programming is locally produced, although is part of Hits Radio for advertising purposes.
Rock FM, local radio station in Lancashire.

Former
Mojo Radio, Classic rock, early pop, blues and soul; broadcast on digital TV and online; ceased broadcasting in 2008.
Q Radio, Rock, alternative rock; broadcast nationally on Freeview and online; closed on 7 May 2013; replaced by Kisstory.
 Radio City Talk, A talk format station which provided rock and sport to Merseyside and the North West. It closed in May 2020 due to no longer having financial viability. It was a sister station to Radio City and Greatest Hits Radio Liverpool & The North West.
Smash Hits Radio, Contemporary pop hits; following its removal from DAB it continued over Freeview, until being withdrawn to release a slot for KissFresh.
3C, Country music station, based in Glasgow, acquired as part of SRH takeover, broadcast on DAB in various areas and Freeview nationally; closed 2007; replaced on Freeview by a relay of Clyde 1 for a time.

DAB multiplexes
Bauer is a partner in one of the UK's national commercial multiplexes, operates twelve wholly owned local DAB multiplexes, and jointly owns a further three with Global Radio; the firm was also formerly a minority partner (of Wireless Group) for local services in three further areas. Bauer operates the following DAB multiplexes:

Sound Digital
Bauer has a 30% holding in Sound Digital, operator of the second national commercial DAB multiplex to launch in the UK; this began transmissions in spring 2016 and several Bauer stations broadcast on it, some transferred from other multiplexes. The other partners are Wireless Group (30%) and Arqiva (40%).

Bauer Digital Radio
Bauer's wholly owned digital multiplexes are primarily located in areas where the firm operates local FM stations; the original group of Bauer (formerly Emap) DAB multiplexes are located in the following areas:

Central Lancashire – Bauer Central Lancashire
Humberside – Bauer Humberside
Leeds – Bauer Leeds
Liverpool – Bauer Liverpool
North Cumbria - Bauer North Cumbria
South Yorkshire – Bauer South Yorkshire
Teesside – Bauer Teesside
Tyne and Wear – Bauer Tyne & Wear

Score Digital
As part of Emap's takeover of Scottish Radio Holdings, the firm gained control of Score Digital, the DAB multiplex operator owned by SRH. Competition guidelines required the merged firm to divest of one of the multiplexes obtained in this deal, and so the Ayr multiplex formerly run by Score was sold on to Arqiva. The remaining Score multiplexes have since been relabelled as Bauer multiplexes.

The ex-Score DAB multiplexes are located in:
Dundee – Score Dundee
Edinburgh – Score Edinburgh
Glasgow – Score Glasgow
Inverness – Score Inverness
Northern Ireland – Score Northern Ireland

Bauer DAB
The Wireless Group and Emap entered into a venture to run the following three DAB multiplexes. These multiplexes were initially branded as TWG-Emap multiplexes; following the sale of TWG to UTV (creating UTV Radio), the multiplexes were relabelled as UTV-Emap, and following the sale of Emap's radio assets to Bauer, the blocks were renamed again as UTV-Bauer. Bauer owned 30 per cent of the UTV-Bauer venture, but sold its stake in November 2013. Now wholly owned by Bauer Radio following the sale of the Wireless local stations in 2019.

Stoke-on-Trent – Stoke & Stafford (DAB Multiplex)
Swansea – Swansea SW Wales (DAB Multiplex)
West Yorkshire – Bradford & Huddersfield (DAB Multiplex)

CE Digital
Bauer and Global Radio jointly own CE Digital Ltd, each holding 50% of the venture. The CE operation was established by Emap in partnership with the Capital Radio Group, which through mergers subsequently became part of GCap Media and later Global Radio. The 'CE' multiplexes take their name from the initials of Capital and Emap, and have not been renamed despite the identity changes of both operators.

CE Digital operate the following DAB multiplexes:

 Birmingham – CE Birmingham
 London – CE London (also known as Greater London I)
 Manchester – CE Manchester

Radio City 2 balloons
In 2008 Radio City 2 started annually releasing hundreds of balloons (with messages attached) from the roof of the Radio City 2 "in memory of loved ones that we miss at Christmas time." This practice continued on an annual basis until December 2016. It ended because the helium-filled balloons caused widespread litter and were dangerous for animals to eat. On 22 December 2016, Radio City 2 and presenter Pete Price were contacted by numerous scuba divers and members of the public urging them to cancel the planned mass balloon release at midnight on 22 December. The balloon release went ahead. Two diving journalists contacted Radio City 2's owner, Bauer Media Group, asking for the practice to be stopped. Bauer Media confirmed that no company within the Group would conduct a balloon release in the future. An exception to this was made by Key 103 on 24 May 2017, two days after the Manchester Arena bombing, in memory of the 22 victims.

References

External links
 Company website

 
Radio broadcasting companies of the United Kingdom
Bauer Group (UK)
Companies based in Peterborough
Mass media companies established in 2008
British companies established in 2008